The collegiate ekiden championships in Japan are held for women and for men.  The women's championship is in late October and the men's championship is in early November. These dates are relatively early in the ekiden season, with several other major races in subsequent months.

All-Japan Collegiate Women's Ekiden Championship (Morinomiyako Ekiden)
The annual All-Japan Collegiate Women's Ekiden Championship, begun in 1981 and also called Morinomiyako Ekiden, is held in Sendai Miyage Prefecture at the end of October. It is a 6-stage, 38.6 kilometer race from Miyagi Track and Field Grounds to Sendai City Hall. Video showing Sendai course and terrain. The race is broadcast nationwide from Sendai on Nihon Television broadcast home page (in Japanese).
 2009 Preview in English, 2010 Results in English, 2011 Results in English, 2011 Results in Japanese.

All-Japan Collegiate (Men's) Ekiden Championship
On the first Sunday of November, the men compete in the 8 stage, 106.8 kilometer National Collegiate Ekiden Championship in Aichi and Mie Prefectures. This race is the second of the season's big three, the first being the Izumo Ekiden and the last being the Hakone Ekiden.  Here, 27 teams battle for the national title.  The race starts in front of Atsuta Shrine in Nagoya City and then proceeds out of the city, along the coast and 106.8 kilometers later to Ise Grand Shrine in Ise, Mie Prefecture. Two versions of the course map are available:  the meet website's own map, and TV Asahi's google map version. TV Asahi provides 2011 video highlights. 

The top six teams in the race are automatically seeded for the following year's race. Other teams must qualify in a series of June track meets featuring 10,000 meter races. Kanto Region qualifier

The 2011 (43rd) race featured defending national champion and course record holder Waseda University and Izumo winner and eventual Hakone Ekiden winner Toyo University. However, on this day Komazawa University won, taking its 9th national title is 17 years. Toyo University's anchor Ryuji Kashiwabara almost made up the 1:40 deficit over 19.7 km but came up half a minute short - English meet summary.

Summary

Record
From 2018, the distance of each course has been changed.

Triple crown

Winning the Izumo Ekiden and the next year's Hakone Ekiden at the same time is called the Triple Crown, and 5 teams have achieved it in the past.

See also
 Relay race
 Cross country running
 Nike Team Nationals
 Middle distance track event

References 

Ekiden
Athletics in Japan